The Reawakening may refer to:
 The Reawakening - an album by the band The Berzerker
 A memoir, also known as The Truce, by Primo Levi